Dominique Fishback (born March 22, 1991) is an American actress and playwright who is best known for having played Billie Rowan on Show Me a Hero, Darlene on The Deuce, and Deborah Johnson in Judas and the Black Messiah, the latter of which earned her a nomination for a BAFTA Award for Best Actress in a Supporting Role. In 2023, she began starring in the Amazon Prime Video psychological horror series Swarm by Donald Glover.

Early life
Fishback first became interested in acting at about the age of 10. She graduated from Pace University with a B.A. in Theater in 2013.

Career
In 2014, Fishback premiered her Off-Off-Broadway play Subverted where she played 22 characters. Subverted was nominated for a 2015 Innovative Theater Award for Outstanding Solo Performance. In 2016, Abingdon Theatre Company announced Fishback as one of its recipients of its inaugural Residency Program.

The actress's first major recurring role was in the Yonkers housing drama Show Me a Hero as single mother Billie Rowan.

Her first series regular role is in the 1970s Times Square drama The Deuce. Fishback has been noted as one of the standouts in the show due to her performance as the "sweetly vulnerable" prostitute Darlene. Co-creator David Simon has noted her strengths as an actress in playing Darlene. For her role on The Deuce, Fishback was listed by USA Today as one of five new faces that people should be watching on fall 2017 television.

Her first film is Night Comes On, which premiered at the 2018 Sundance Film Festival.

She played the part of Kenya in the film The Hate U Give (2018), which is based on the popular young adult book. Also in 2018, Fishback appeared as a younger version of Jay-Z’s mother, Gloria Carter, in his music video for "Smile."

Fishback plays a street-smart teenager in Project Power, directed by Ariel Schulman and Henry Joost, opposite Jamie Foxx and Joseph Gordon-Levitt, which was released on August 14, 2020, by Netflix.

In 2021, she starred in Judas and the Black Messiah alongside Daniel Kaluuya, as Deborah Johnson, the partner of Fred Hampton and the expectant mother of Fred Hampton Jr.

Filmography

Film

Television

Awards and nominations

References

External links

Actresses from New York City
African-American actresses
American film actresses
American television actresses
Living people
Pace University alumni
Year of birth missing (living people)
21st-century African-American people
21st-century African-American women
21st-century American actresses
1991 births